(formerly Aster kentuckiensis) is a species of rare flowering plant in the Asteraceae family and is commonly known as , , , , or . It is a perennial, herbaceous plant that is endemic to broken limestone cedar glades and roadsides in Alabama, Georgia, Kentucky, and Tennessee. It is a nearly hairless plant with blue to blue-violet ray florets.

In 2021, botanist MaxE. Medley proposed that this treatment was incorrect. The hybrid is a somewhat hairy plant rather than a hairless one, and its characteristics are intermediate between its parents.

NatureServe considers  Apparently Secure (G4) globally and Imperiled (S2) in Kentucky where the holotype was collected near Bowling Green in October 1898 by botanist  Price. Aster kentuckiensis was then formally described by botanist Nathaniel Lord Britton in 1901.

Description 

Symphyotrichum kentuckiense is a rare perennial, herbaceous plant endemic to areas of Alabama, Georgia, Kentucky, and Tennessee in the southeastern United States. The rootstock has short, branched underground caudices and no rhizomes.

Stems 
 has from one to three or more glabrous (hairless) stems extending from the root base. These stems can be decumbent, growing horizontally along the ground and turned up at the ends, to ascending. They are green to reddish-brown.

Leaves 
The species has thin alternate leaves that are dark green to bluish-green with glabrous faces. Leaves occur at the base, on stems, and on inflorescence branches. Depending upon the locations of the leaves on the plant, the apices, or tips, can be noticeably pointed (acute to acuminate), obtuse, mucronate, or cuspidate.

Basal leaves are either without leafstalks (called petioles), making them sessile, or they have very short petioles with sheathing wings that are fringed with hairs on their edges, making them ciliate. The basal leaves are oblanceolate to obovate with obtuse apices, and their bases are cuneate (wedge-shaped) to attenuate. Their margins (edges) are entire, meaning they are smooth with no teeth or lobes. Rarely, they can be sparsely saw-toothed, also called serrate. The basal leaves grow in a rosette that develops prior to flowering. These leaves wither or die during plant growth, and at the time of flowering, another rosette of basal leaves forms.

Lower and middle stem leaves are sessile or may have petioles with narrow wings. They usually wither by the time the plant flowers. They have attenuate to cuneate bases that can be auriculate (shaped like earlobes) or clasp the stem.

The linear-lanceolate to narrowly subulate distal leaves are sessile and get progressively smaller as they approach the flower heads. Distal leaf bases are subauriculate (somewhat earlobe-shaped) and can clasp the stem. Their margins are entire but have cilia closer to the branches. The small,  inflorescence leaves are often formed in clusters called fascicles.

Flowers 

The flower heads grow in leafy paniculiform to racemiform arrays on inflorescences that are straight and ascending or can have wide angles between the branches. Divaricate branching can cause the plant to appear as a small shrub. At times, the flower heads can be secund, appearing on one side of the branch.

There are  linear to subulate and stiff, glabrous bracts on each peduncle. Bracts closest to the heads can be so long that their lengths exceed the heights of the involucres.

Involucres and phyllaries 
On the outsides of the flower heads of all members of the family Asteraceae are small bracts that look like scales. These are called phyllaries, and together they form the involucre that protects the individual flowers in the head before they open.

The margins of each phyllary may appear white or light green but are translucent. The phyllaries have green chlorophyllous zones that are diamond-shaped to lanceolate with apices that are acute to long-acuminate, mucronate to apiculate, such that they could be tapering to a slender point. They are revolute (they roll inwards on the margins) and spread away from the head.

Florets 
Each flower head is made up of ray florets and disk florets. The  ray florets grow in one series and are usually blue-violet, rarely white.

The disks have  florets that start out as yellow and after opening, turn brown after pollination.

Fruit 
The fruits (seeds) of Symphyotrichum kentuckiense are not true achenes but are cypselae, resembling an achene but surrounded by a calyx sheath. This is true for all members of the Asteraceae family. After pollination, they become tan to brown with an obovoid shape,  in length with  nerves, and with a few stiff, slender bristles on their surfaces (strigillose).

Chromosomes 
The species has a monoploid number (also called base number) of eight chromosomes  It has eight sets of its chromosomes, meaning it is octaploid, giving it a total chromosome count of 64.

Taxonomy

Classification 
Symphyotrichum kentuckiense is classified in subgenus Symphyotrichum section Symphyotrichum subsection Porteriani. This subsection contains four species in addition to : S.depauperatum, S.parviceps, S.pilosum, and S.porteri. It is the only octaploid within the subsection.

History 
The basionym of Symphyotrichum kentuckiense is Aster kentuckiensis. Its name with author citations is Symphyotrichum kentuckiense . The plant was formally described as a unique species and named Aster kentuckiensis  by botanist Nathaniel Lord Britton in 1901 in his publication Manual of the Flora of the Northern States and Canada. Price near Bowling Green, Kentucky.

Hybrid Symphyotrichum× priceae 
At the same time that she collected what became the holotype for Aster kentuckiensis, SadieF. Price collected a similar plant that Britton named Aster priceae  and included in its description that it is pubescent, or with soft hairs. In a 2021 journal article by botanist MaxE.

In 1948, botanist Arthur Cronquist reduced Aster priceae to a variety of  named  priceae  which Medley posited was a conclusion "based on misidentified specimens and [was] not appropriate."

Medley suggested that the Aster priceae holotype and Britton's protologue were of the hybrid   pilosus. He gave it the hybrid designation and acknowledged the name as  priceae , with Aster priceae  as its basionym. , this hybrid name was accepted by Plants of the World Online (POWO). The hybrid is a puberulent plant rather than a glabrous one, and its characteristics are intermediate between its parents.

Etymology 
The specific epithet (second part of the scientific name) kentuckiense is a Latinization of the name of the state of Kentucky where the holotype was found. The hybrid's specific epithet priceae is a Latinization of the surname of the collector,  Price. The species has the common names of Kentucky aster, Price's aster, Miss Price's aster, Sadie's aster, and lavender oldfield aster. "Old field asters" is a common name for subsect. Porteriani.

Distribution and habitat 
Symphyotrichum kentuckiense is endemic to a limited range in the southeastern United States, specifically parts of Alabama, Georgia, Kentucky, and Tennessee. It is adapted to and known from breaks or cracks in limestone cedar glades or limestone roadsides.

 is categorized on the United States National Wetland Plant List (NWPL) with the wetland indicator status rating of Facultative Upland (FACU) in the Eastern Mountains and Piedmont region (EMP). This rating means that it usually occurs in non-wetlands within its range, but can occasionally be found in wetlands.

Ecology 
Symphyotrichum kentuckiense has coefficients of conservatism  in the Floristic Quality Assessment (FQA) of  depending on evaluation region. In the Interior Plateau EPA Ecoregions of  its  is 8. Both of these  mean that its populations are found in high-quality remnant natural areas with little environmental degradation but can tolerate some periodic disturbance.

Conservation 
, NatureServe listed  as Apparently Secure (G4) globally; Apparently Secure (S4) in Georgia; Imperiled (S2) in Kentucky; and, Critically Imperiled (S1) in South Carolina.

Notes

Citations

References

External links 

 

kentuckiense
Flora of Alabama
Flora of Georgia (U.S. state)
Flora of Kentucky
Flora of Tennessee
Plants described in 1901
Taxa named by Nathaniel Lord Britton
Endemic flora of the United States